Stade Aurillacois Cantal Auvergne (commonly known as Aurillac) is a French professional rugby union club that was founded in 1904 and currently play in the Rugby Pro D2, the second division of French rugby. Aurillac`s home matches are mostly played at the Stade Jean Alric, which has a capacity of around 9,000.

Honours
 Première Division Groupe B
 Runners-up: 1996
 Fédérale 1
 Winner: 2007
 Coupe de France
 Runners-up: 1986

Current standings

Current squad

The Aurillac squad for the 2022–23 season is:

Espoirs squad

Notable former players

 Victor Boffelli
 Danie De Beer
 Thomas Domingo
 Romeo Gontineac
 Wade Grintell
 Olivier Magne
 Sébastien Viars
 Jean-François Viars
 Keith Andrews
 John O'Connor
 Phillipe Kilroe
 Mark Andrews
 Forrest Gainer
 Joel Bates
 Pierre Trémouille
 Didier Casadeï
 Graydon Staniforth
 Harold Karele
 Jacques Burger
 Jason Marshall
 Ludovic Mercier
 Daniel Kotze

See also
 List of rugby union clubs in France
 Rugby union in France

References

External links
  Stade Aurillacois Official website

1904 establishments in France
Rugby clubs established in 1904
Sport in Cantal